The Complete Idiot (Spanish: La tonta del bote) is a 1939 Spanish comedy film directed by Gonzalo Delgrás. It was remade in 1970.

Cast
In alphabetical order
 Ángel Alguacil
 Rafael Durán 
 Camino Garrigó 
 Sacha Goudine  as dancer  
 Josita Hernán  
 Carmen López Lagar 
 Amparo Martí  
 Antoñita Mas
 Olga B. Peiró

References

Bibliography 
 Bentley, Bernard. A Companion to Spanish Cinema. Boydell & Brewer 2008.

External links 
 

1939 comedy films
Spanish comedy films
1939 films
1930s Spanish-language films
Films directed by Gonzalo Delgrás
Spanish black-and-white films